Kathrin Hölzl (born 18 July 1984) is a retired World Cup alpine ski racer from Germany.  Born in Berchtesgaden, Bavaria, she was the gold medalist in the giant slalom at the 2009 World Championships.

Hölzl made her World Cup debut in December 2001 in Val d'Isère, France. Following her world championship in February 2009, she scored her first World Cup victory in a giant slalom at Aspen in November, followed by another win in December at Lienz. She made two additional podiums and won the World Cup giant slalom title for the 2010 season. In October 2013 Hölzl announced her retirement from the sport after struggling with injuries and illness for several years, having last competed in a World Cup race in December 2011.

World Cup results

Season standings

Season titles

Races podiums 
2 wins – (2 GS)
9 podiums – (9 GS)

References

External links

 Kathrin Hölzl World Cup standings at the International Ski Federation
 
 
 katy-hoelzl.de - personal site - 
 German Ski Team (DSV) - Kathrin Hölzl - 
Fischer Skis - athletes - Kathrin Hölzl

German female alpine skiers
1984 births
Living people
Alpine skiers at the 2010 Winter Olympics
Olympic alpine skiers of Germany
People from Berchtesgaden
Sportspeople from Upper Bavaria
FIS Alpine Ski World Cup champions
21st-century German women